Greater Kyoto is a metropolitan area in Japan encompassing Kyoto City, the capital of Kyoto Prefecture, as well as its surrounding areas including Ōtsu, the capital of Shiga Prefecture.

The metropolitan area is also referred to as Keiji (京滋) or Keishin (京津). The name Keiji is constructed by extracting a representative kanji from Kyoto (京都) and Shiga (滋賀). The name Keishin is constructed by extracting a representative kanji from Kyoto (京都) and Ōtsu (大津).

Definitions

Urban Employment Area 

The greater Kyoto area is defined by Urban Employment Area as Kyoto–Kusatsu Metropolitan Employment Area (Kyoto–Kusatsu MEA). The metropolitan area had a total population of 2,801,044 as of 2015 and is the fourth-largest in Japan. The cities and towns of the metropolitan area with their 2020 populations are listed below.

 Kyoto Prefecture
 Kyoto City (1,463,723)
 Uji (179,630)
 Kameoka (86,174)
 Nagaokakyō (80,608)
 Jōyō (74,607)
 Kyōtanabe (73,753)
 Mukō (56,859)
 Nantan (31,629)
 Kumiyama (15,250)
 Ōyamazaki (15,953)
 Kyotamba (12,907)
 Ujitawara (8,911)
 Ide (7,406)
 Shiga Prefecture
 Ōtsu (345,070)
 Kusatsu (143,913)
 Moriyama (83,236)
 Ritto (68,820)
 Yasu (50,513)

Municipalities network 

This area consists of 13 cities and towns of Shiga Prefecture, Kyoto Prefecture, and Osaka Prefecture, in addition to Kyoto MEA. The total population as of 2020 for the region was estimated at 3,785,351. The following areas, along with the above Kyoto MEA, are included in the Kyoto metropolitan area, with their 2020 populations:

 Kyoto Prefecture
 Yawata (70,433)
 Kizugawa (77,907)
 Seika (36,198)
 Shiga Prefecture
 Takashima (46,377)
 Konan (54,460)
 Koka (88,358)
 Ōmihachiman (81,122)
 Higashiōmi (112,819)
 Hino (20,964)
 Ryūō (11,789)
 Osaka Prefecture
 Takatsuki (352,698)
 Shimamoto (30,927)

Geography 

 Lake Biwa – the largest lake in Japan
  – Shiga Prefecture
  – the southern part of Kyoto Prefecture
 Mount Hiei – mountain on the border between Kyoto and Ōtsu
 Seta River and Uji River
 Kizu River
 Yasu River
 Katsura River

Higher Education 
 Bukkyo University – 5 campuses in Kyoto and Nantan
 Doshisha University – 2 campuses in Kyoto and Kyōtanabe
 Heian Jogakuin University – 2 campuses in Kyoto and Takatsuki
 Kyoto University – 3 campuses in Kyoto and Uji
 Kyoto University of Advanced Science – 2 campuses in Kyoto and Kameoka
 Ritsumeikan University – 4 campuses in Kyoto, Kusatsu, and Ibaraki
 Ryukoku University – 3 campuses in Kyoto and Ōtsu

Sports 
 Kyoto Sanga FC – a football club
 MIO Biwako Shiga – a football club
 Kyoto Hannaryz – a basketball team
 Shiga Lakestars – a basketball team
 Kyoto Marathon
 Kyoto Racecourse
 Sanga Stadium by Kyocera

Media 
 Kyoto Shimbun – newspaper
 KBS Kyoto – TV and radio station
 BBC Biwako – TV station
  – radio station
  – publishing house
 Leaf Publications – publishing house

Transportation

Rail 

Kyōto Station is a hub of the rail network in the area.
 Tōkaidō Shinkansen – inter-city rail (JR Central)
 Biwako Line and JR Kyoto Line – regional and commuter rail (JR West)
 Kosei Line – regional and commuter rail (JR West)
 San'in Main Line – regional and commuter rail (JR West)
 Nara Line – commuter rail (JR West)
 Kusatsu Line – commuter rail (JR West)
 Kyoto Line (Kintetsu) – regional and commuter rail (Kintetsu)
 Keihan Main Line and Uji Line – commuter rail (Keihan)
 Keishin Line – commuter rail, subway, and tram (Keihan)
 Ishiyama Sakamoto Line – commuter rail and tram (Keihan)
 Hankyu Kyoto Main Line and Hankyu Arashiyama Line – commuter rail (Hankyu)
 Arashiyama Line and Kitano Line – commuter rail and tram (Randen)
 Karasuma Line and Tōzai Line – Kyoto City Subway
 Eizan Main Line and Kurama Line – commuter rail (Eiden)

Road 

 Meishin Expressway
 Shin-Meishin Expressway
 Kyoto-Jukan Expressway
 Keinawa Expressway
 Keiji Bypass
 Daini-Keihan Road
 Japan National Route 1
 Japan National Route 8
 Japan National Route 9
 Japan National Route 24
 Japan National Route 161
 Japan National Route 171

See also 
 List of metropolitan areas in Japan by population

References

External links 
 Workers and Students Commuting to Kyoto-shi - Statistics Bureau, Ministry of Internal Affairs and Communications
 京都都市圏自治体ネットワーク
  
  

Metropolitan areas of Japan
Keihanshin